A  bank clearing number or BC number is a number used for the identification of financial institutions in Switzerland and Liechtenstein. Bank clearing numbers are connected to the Swiss Interbank Clearing and the
EuroSIC system.

Bank clearing numbers consists of 3 to 5 digits. To identify a particular branch of a financial institution clearly, a store ID is specified in addition to the bank clearing number.

List of bank clearing numbers 

The first digit of the bank clearing number represents the institution:

External links 

 Download BC-Bankenstamm bei SIX Interbank Clearing (ge) 

Banking in Switzerland
Banking technology
Bank codes